is a railway station in the city of Mizuho, Gifu Prefecture, Japan, operated by the private railway operator Tarumi Railway.

Lines

Station layout
Yokoya Station has one ground-level side platform serving a single bi-directional track. The station is unattended.

Adjacent stations

|-
!colspan=5|Tarumi Railway

History
Yokoya Station opened on February 15, 1960

Surrounding area

Mizuho Minami Elementary School

See also
 List of Railway Stations in Japan

References

External links

 

Railway stations in Gifu Prefecture
Railway stations in Japan opened in 1960
Stations of Tarumi Railway
Mizuho, Gifu